Fairless is a surname. Notable people with the surname include:

Benjamin Franklin Fairless (1890–1962), American steel company executive
Jack Fairless, manager of the English football club Darlington from 1928 to 1933
Rick Fairless, well-known figure in custom choppers
Stephen Fairless, Australian cyclist and olympian
Thomas Kerr Fairless, English painter

See also
Fairless High School, public high school in Brewster, Ohio
Fairless Hills, Pennsylvania, census-designated place (CDP) in Bucks County, Pennsylvania, United States
Fairless Local School District, school district located in Stark County, Ohio, United States